Padua College is an independent Roman Catholic boys' primary and high school located in the Brisbane suburb of Kedron, Queensland, Australia. The college derives its name from Franciscan friar Saint Anthony of Padua (1195–1231), appointed by St Francis as the first professor of theology for the friars. Padua is the university city of Northern Italy where St Anthony died. The College is the only school owned and operated by the Franciscan Friars in Australia and only the second in the Southern Hemisphere along with St Francis of Assisi College in Timor-Leste. Students of the college are known in the community as "Paduans". The college draws students from the central, northern and western areas of Brisbane.

History of the college

Padua College derived its name from the Franciscan friar Saint Anthony of Padua (1195-1231), appointed by St Francis as the first professor of theology for the friars. Padua is the university city of northern Italy where St Anthony died.

Padua began in 1956 when the Franciscan Sisters, who cared for the parish primary school of St Anthony, were no longer able to cater for the large number of boys at their school. At the request of Sister Mary Bernadette O’Callaghan OSF, the friars, who had taken charge of the Kedron parish since 1929, agreed to begin a separate school for boys.

Damian Nolan OFM was appointed nominal rector of the new school, which began with two lay teachers, Eileen 
Cameron and John Fox, and 89 boys in Years 4, 5 and 6. The friars began teaching at the school in 1957 with the arrival of Alban Mitchell OFM, Angelo O’Hagan OFM and, a little later, Odoric (Hugh) Fathers OFM.

Since that time, Padua has developed with many extensions and facilities. At present there are over 1360 students enrolled at the college.

In November 2006, former rector from 1990 - 2000, former chaplain 2000-2022, John Boyd-Boland† released his book On A Cragged Hill - A Fifty Year Story reliving the events and history of Padua College since its beginnings in 1956. Boyd-Boland is also the old name of one houses at Padua college.

Former Rectors: 

 Fr Damian Nolan O.F.M
 Father John Boyd-Boland†
 Mr Robert Out†

Sport
The college is a member of the Associated Independent Colleges (AIC) and Combined Independent Colleges (CIC) whose sporting competitions usually take place on Saturdays. Padua College has won the confraternity shield numerous times with their last title in 2005. In 2014, Padua College was successful in winning the Bob Linder trophy. Padua rugby league alumni include Paul McCabe, Paul Vautin, Shane Perry, David Stagg, David Shillington, David Bouveng and Dane Carlaw.

AIC premierships 
Padua College's Associated Independent Colleges premierships since its inception in 1999 include:

Confraternity Shield results 

The Confraternity Shield is a statewide schoolboy rugby league competition in Queensland that started in 1980. Arguably the biggest and most competitive junior schoolboy rugby league competition in the world with around 50 schools competing each year, Padua College has been one of the most successful schools to compete. Padua College has also a very proud history of producing the most State of Origin players to come from one school. These State of Origin players include Paul Vautin, David Shillington, David Stagg, Dane Carlaw, Paul McCabe and Lindsay Collins

Co-curricular activities
All boys attending the College are required to represent Padua in co-curricular activities. The College offers students the opportunity to participate in debating and public speaking events, chess competitions and music and drama programs. In addition, the College also enters teams into the Associated Independent Colleges competition for the following sports: Swimming, Water Polo, Cricket, Volleyball, Rugby, AFL, Football (soccer), Tennis, Basketball, Golf, Athletics. Chess and Cross Country.

Padua College (5-12 boys school) Mt Alvernia (7-12 girls school) and St Anthony's(prep-4 for the boys and prep-7 for girls) come together to create the FCIP, Franciscan Colleges Instrumental Program which is the major musical groups on the hill with many instruments to play and learn and there are many orchestras to play in. These 3 schools are well known as the FOTH, franciscans on the hill.

All boys are encouraged to compete in the College's annual Inter-House Swimming, Cross Country and Athletics Carnivals. Padua College has its playing fields on a 73,000m2 site at Elliot Road Banyo for cricket, rugby and soccer. Padua has an ongoing rivalry with their northside counterparts in the AIC St Patrick's College, Shorncliffe (SPC) which has grown into one of the most passionate AIC rivalries attracting large crowds. The Northside Challenge is a sporting challenge between the two schools for Rugby and Soccer.

Padua has a well-equipped Music Department which includes a recording studio and sound-proof drum room. Tuition is available in all orchestral instruments. The orchestras at the college are generally of a high quality and a wide variety of instruments are available for student hire. Students are frequently encouraged to take up viola as the high prevalence of students who quit provides a large number of instruments for hire. Students are encouraged to become members of the Concert Bands, Big Band, String Orchestras and Symphony Orchestra. All Year 8 students study piano and guitar as part of the ordinary school curriculum. Music is taught as a Board Subject in Years 9 through to 12. Every alternate year the boys and girls from Mt Alvernia and Padua College produce a stage musical. Recent productions have included Joseph and the Amazing Technicolor Dreamcoat, Les Misérables, Jesus Christ Superstar, and Oliver!. The latest collaborative production between the two schools is The Wiz, released in 2018.

Campus
The college is situated at Kedron on two campuses. The primary department also known as the Greccio campus, catering for boys from Years 5 and 6 on the eastern side of Turner Rd and the Year 7 to 12 boys on the western side also known as the Assisi campus.  Two other Franciscan schools, St. Anthony's and Mt. Alvernia are also in the precinct. Padua College boasts excellent facilities for the students to use. The college has recently refurbished all classrooms, installed more computers and constructed two new buildings; a sports complex and a multi purpose centre containing a library, seminar rooms and computer labs (renovations completed early 2006). Other facilities the school features include:

 25x25m swimming pool
 Rugby-sized oval with 1,500-capacity grandstand
 Indoor and outdoor basketball, volleyball and tennis courts
 Gymnasium
 Large multipurpose hall (La Cordelle Centre)
 Music rooms with soundproof recording studios
 Primary and secondary libraries
 Science and graphics labs
 Industrial skills centre
 300-seat auditorium
 St Francis Hall (Main office building)
 Performing Arts Centre  PADUA COLLEGE KEDRON – ART AND SCIENCE PRECINCT

Padua College has an outdoor education centre called "Amaroo" at Pomona on the Sunshine Coast. Most year levels visit the camp every year. Amaroo is located on 68.8 hectares of lush rainforest and boasts luxurious facilities including a high and low ropes course and rock climbing walls. The outdoor education centre is located closely to Lake Cootharaba and canoeing is involved regularly.

In addition to in-school facilities and the Outdoor Education Centre, the school owns 73,000m2 of playing fields on Elliot Rd, Banyo, which is used for rugby, soccer and athletics carnivals.

Houses
“In the College, each boy belongs to one of six Houses: Beirne House (est. 1996), Boyd-Boland House (est. 2013), Grigg House (est. 1996), Kirby House (est. 2013), Mitchell House (est. 1996) and Odoric House (est. 2005). The names of the Houses honour six prominent friar teachers who have taught or are teaching at Padua”

New 2020 Houses
In 2019, the College Board made a decision to rename the houses beginning in 2020. The new houses, slogans, and symbols honour the very first followers of St Francis. Angelo House replaced Grigg House, Cattani House replaced Mitchell House, Leo House replaced Kirby House, Masseo House replaced Odoric House, Quintavalle House replaced Boyd-Boland House and Rufino House replaced Beirne House.

Ed Nally Cup
The Ed Nally Cup is the competition between houses, based on the points earned by the tenants for their house through participation, community service, academic success, etc.

Padua Dash
The Padua Dash is the annual cross country championship relay race that involves running throughout the Assisi Campus. The fastest runner from each house in each grade partakes in an effort to be the fastest house in the relay. Order is sorted by grade so each age group competes at the same leg in the race. The fastest house to run the 1 kilometre course in all age groups is crowned Padua Dash Champions. The most recent champions were the Leo House who won in 2020.

Notable alumni

Sports
 Rohan Ahern (rugby league player for the Sydney Roosters)
 Jacob Allison (Australian rules footballer for the Brisbane Lions)
 Harris Andrews (Australian rules footballer for the Brisbane Lions)
 Oskar Baker (Australian rules footballer for Melbourne)
 Tony Bamford (Australian rules footballer for Port Adelaide in the SANFL)
 David Bouveng (rugby league player for the Gold Coast Seagulls, North Queensland Cowboys and Halifax Blue Sox)
 Dane Carlaw (rugby league player for the Brisbane Broncos and Catalans Dragons)
 Lindsay Collins (rugby league player for the Sydney Roosters)
 Hudson Creighton (rugby union player for the Queensland Reds)
 Lawson Creighton (rugby union player for the Queensland Reds)
 Peter Dale (swimmer at the 1984 Summer Olympics)
 Will Martyn (Australian rules footballer for Richmond)
 Paul McCabe (rugby league player for multiple Sydney-based clubs)
 Peter Nowill (long-distance runner at the 2004 Summer Olympics)
 Tom O'Toole (rugby union player for Ulster and the Ireland national team)
 Shane Perry (rugby league player for multiple clubs)
 David Shillington (rugby league player for the Sydney Roosters, Canberra Raiders and Gold Coast Titans)
 David Stagg (rugby league player for the Brisbane Broncos and Canterbury Bulldogs)
 Paul Vautin (rugby league player and commentator)
 Brad Watts (rugby league player for the Melbourne Storm, South Sydney Rabbitohs and Widnes Vikings)
 Michael Wood (rugby union player for the Queensland Reds and New South Wales Waratahs)
 Jamie Young (association football goalkeeper, notably for Aldershot Town and Brisbane Roar)

Entertainment and media
 Damien Garvey (film and television actor)
 Daniel Gaudiello (ballet dancer)
 Chris Mitchell (journalist and editor-in-chief of The Australian)
 Marty O'Brien and Danny Procopis (musicians and members of rock band Small Mercies)
 Greg Thomson (journalist)
 John Willsteed (musician and member of rock band The Go-Betweens)

Business
 Eddy Groves (businessman and founder of ABC Learning)
 Craig Steven Wright (computer scientist, businessman and alleged Bitcoin creator)

Politics
 Dan Purdie (politician and state MP for Ninderry)
 Jimmy Sullivan (politician and state MP for Stafford)

Other
 Geoffrey Harding OAM (medical practitioner)

References

External links

Catholic primary schools in Brisbane
Catholic secondary schools in Brisbane
Boys' schools in Queensland
Educational institutions established in 1956
Junior School Heads Association of Australia Member Schools
Kedron, Queensland
1956 establishments in Australia